Yuma Crossing is a site in Arizona and California that is significant for its association with transportation and communication across the Colorado River.  It connected New Spain and Las Californias in the Spanish Colonial period in and also during the Western expansion of the United States.  Features of the Arizona side include the Yuma Quartermaster Depot and Yuma Territorial Prison.  Features on the California Side include Fort Yuma,  which protected the area from 1850 to 1885.

History 

The history of the Yuma Crossing began at the formation of two massive granite outcroppings on the Colorado River. The narrowing of the river provided the only crossing point for a thousand miles, thus making it a focal point for the Patayan tribes, and later the Quechan.

In 1540, well before the British Europeans touched Plymouth Rock in 1620, Yuma's European history began here with the arrival of Spanish explorer Hernando de Alarcón.  It was not until after the 17th and 18th century explorations of the padres Kino and Garcés that the crossing came to be used by the Spanish expeditions of Juan Bautista de Anza and others along this route from 1774.  This route, sometimes called the Sonora Road, ran from the Spanish Tubac Presidio, in Sonora to Alta California.  An attempt to establish missions and colonize the area of the crossing was made by the Spanish soon after but it failed, when the formerly friendly Quechan were angered to the point of a violent revolt that ended the missions, the colony and the use of the land route until the 19th century.  Mexican expeditions mollified the Quechan and persuaded them to allow the use of the crossings, reopening the Sonora Road to Alta California from the later 1820s.

Much later the Yuma Crossing became the focal point for travel to the Wild West, from the 1840s California Gold Rush era to the arrival of the railroad in the 1877, and finally the Ocean-to-Ocean Bridge, which linked the East coast and the West coast in one land route.

Immediately after the Mexican–American War in 1848, the U.S. Army built Fort Yuma here to protect travelers from Indians raiding the area.  It was the center point of conflict in the Yuma War of 1850–53.  From 1864–1890, the fort and nearby facilities was the main army base to support the US Army's efforts to control the Indians throughout the greater southwest.

At about the same time, the Butterfield Stage established a stagecoach station here for their main line coming from the east to California.

It was declared a National Historic Landmark in 1966, under the name Yuma Crossing and Associated Sites.

National Heritage Area
The Yuma Crossing National Heritage Area is a U.S. National Heritage Area. It was the only lower Colorado River crossing point in the 18th and 19th centuries for non-Native American travelers and immigrants. The Heritage Area is part of the Yuma Crossing and Associated Sites on the National Register of Historic Places and a National Historic Landmark, in Arizona and California.

As with other U.S. National Heritage Areas, the Yuma Crossing National Heritage Area is a local entity in partnership with various stakeholders. At Yuma Crossing, the stakeholders are particularly diverse, including Indian tribes, agricultural interests, environmental and wildlife non-profit organizations, as well as many federal, states, and local agencies.

History park
The Yuma Crossing National Heritage Area includes the Yuma Quartermaster Depot State Historic Park (formerly known as Yuma Crossing State Historic Park), the  Yuma Territorial Prison, Fort Yuma, and other sites, all showcasing the area's history. They are amidst the beautiful and vital Yuma East and West Wetlands, and against the silhouetted backdrops of the Castle Dome, Chocolate (Arizona) and Chocolate (California) Mountains.

The heritage area's interpretive themes include Yuma's importance as a cultural crossroads, emphasizing the region's intersection of three major cultures: Anglo-American, Native American, and Hispanic-Latino. The heritage area recognizes that this rich blend of traditions can best be sustained by their continued expression through architecture, art, music, food, and folkways within the heritage area.

Juan Bautista de Anza National Historic Trail
The Yuma Crossing is a designated site of the Juan Bautista de Anza National Historic Trail, a National Park Service area in the United States National Trails System.

Habitat restoration
The Yuma Heritage Area has championed a wetland and riparian habitat restoration project for the East Wetlands, including returning the Colorado's water flow, in a multiyear, multimillion-dollar effort. In 2004, heritage area partners secured a Clean Water Act permit from the U.S. Army Corps of Engineers to begin restoration work. A one-mile (1.6 km) length of back channel has also been excavated, and some 20,000 new trees were planted in 2006.

To date, ten different funding sources have provided almost $6 million toward the eventual goal of $18–20 million to complete the project.

Area plant life
 Fremont cottonwood – Populus fremontii
 Catclaw Acacia – Acacia greggii
 Blue Palo Verde – Parkinsonia florida
 Velvet mesquite – Prosopis velutina
 Screwbean Mesquite – Prosopis pubescens – "Tornillo"
 Honey Mesquite – Prosopis glandulosa
 Goodding's black willow – Salix gooddingii
 Arroyo Willow – Salix lasiolepis

See also
Alta California
History of California through 1899
John Joel Glanton
List of bridges documented by the Historic American Engineering Record in Arizona
List of historic properties in Yuma, Arizona
Mesquite Bosque
National Register of Historic Places listings in Yuma County, Arizona
National Register of Historic Places listings in Imperial County, California
Quechan
Territorial evolution of California

References

External links
Yuma Quartermaster Depot
Yume Territorial Prison
Fort Yuma history
National Park Service – Juan Bautista de Anza National Historic Trail
official Yuma Crossing National Heritage Area – website

Lower Colorado River Valley
Historic American Engineering Record in Arizona
History of Yuma County, Arizona
History of Imperial County, California
National Historic Landmarks in Arizona
National Historic Landmarks in California
National Heritage Areas of the United States
National Register of Historic Places in Imperial County, California
National Register of Historic Places in Yuma County, Arizona
Road transportation on the National Register of Historic Places
Historic trails and roads in Arizona
Historic trails and roads in California
Transportation in Yuma County, Arizona
Winterhaven, California
Yuma, Arizona
Crossings of the Colorado River